A causewayed enclosure was found at Abingdon in Oxfordshire in 1926.  Causewayed enclosures are a form of early Neolithic earthwork found in northwestern Europe; they were built in England from shortly before 3700 BC until about 3300 BC and are characterized by the full or partial enclosure of an area with ditches that are interrupted by gaps, or causeways. Their purpose is not known; they may have been settlements, or meeting places, or ritual sites.

The enclosure was found in 1926 while quarrying for gravel, and was partly excavated in 1926 and 1927 by E.T. Leeds.  Subsequent excavations took place in 1954 and 1963.  The site was probably constructed in the 37th or 36th century BC.

References

Sources 

 
 
 
Causewayed enclosures
Archaeological sites in Oxfordshire